The Pegas Avis is a Czech single-place paraglider that was designed and produced by Pegas 2000 of Prague. It is now out of production.

Design and development
The aircraft was designed as an intermediate glider. The design has progressed through three generations of models, the Avis 1, 2 and 3, each improving on the last. The Avis 3 was introduced in 2003.

The models are each named for their approximate wing area in square metres.

Variants

Avis 2
Avis 2 24
Small-sized model for lighter pilots.
Avis 2 26
Mid-sized model for medium-weight pilots. The glider model is Swiss SHV Performance certified.
Avis 2 30
Large-sized model for heavier pilots.

Avis 3
Avis 3 26
Small-sized model for lighter pilots. The glider model is Swiss SHV Performance certified.
Avis 3 28
Mid-sized model for medium-weight pilots. The glider model is Swiss SHV Performance certified.
Avis 3 30
Large-sized model for heavier pilots.

Specifications (Avis 2 26)

References

Avis
Paragliders